Kunmingia is a genus of freshwater snails with gills and an operculum, aquatic gastropod mollusks in the family Pomatiopsidae.

Species 
Species within the genus Kunmingia include:
 Kunmingia kumningensis Liu, Wang & Zhang, 1980 - type species

References

Pomatiopsidae